Jozef Vengloš (18 February 1936 – 26 January 2021) was a Slovak professional football player and manager. He held a doctorate in Physical Education and also specialised in Psychology. He was selected by FIFA on various occasions to lecture at the FIFA academies throughout the world.

Playing career

Born in Ružomberok, Czechoslovakia (now in Slovakia), Vengloš played as a midfielder for Slovan Bratislava 1954–1966, and later captained the team, and also played for Czechoslovakia at the B level. After his playing career was prematurely ended by hepatitis, he began his managerial career in Australia, first in club football, before going on to manage the national team. He then returned to Czechoslovakia and coached at club and Under-23 national level.

Coaching career

In 1973, Vengloš was appointed as manager of Slovan Bratislava. During his three years in charge, he twice won the championship. He was also assistant manager of Czechoslovakia from 1973–1978. As assistant to Václav Ježek, he helped guide the team to victory in the Euro 1976, beating the Netherlands in the semi-finals and West Germany in the Final.

As manager of Czechoslovakia from 1978 to 1982, Vengloš led his side to 3rd place in the 1980 European Championship. He also led them to the 1982 World Cup Finals, where they went out in the first round. He then coached Sporting Lisbon from 1983 to 1984, before coaching in Malaysia (Kuala Lumpur FA & Malaysia). In 1988, he was re-appointed to manage Czechoslovakia and took them to the quarter-finals of the 1990 World Cup.

Following the 1990 World Cup, he took over at Aston Villa, becoming the first manager born outside Britain or Ireland to take charge of a top division club in England. He left after one season after they finished just two places above the First Division relegation zone. He then moved to the Turkish league, where he managed Fenerbahçe from 1991 to 1993. He was the first manager of the Slovakia national team from 1993 to 1995, before managing Oman 1996–1997.

Vengloš was appointed as Head Coach of Celtic on 17 July 1998. Season 1998–99 saw his Celtic team in some excellent form, but they failed to qualify for the Champions League. At the end of the season, Vengloš left to take up a new position as a European technical adviser and as a scout for Celtic. He is most credited with signing fans' idol Ľubomír Moravčík during his season as manager. Other successful signings include club legend Johan Mjallby and while a trophy evaded Vengloš, he is still looked upon fondly by fans for bringing such players to the club. The stand-out of his reign came as his Celtic side inflicted a punishing 5–1 defeat on arch-rivals Rangers in the first half of the season. In the new year of 1999, he also took Celtic to Ibrox where they held their Old Firm rivals to a 2–2 draw on their own soil.

He later managed Japanese team JEF United Ichihara for a season in 2002.

Honours

Player

 ŠK Slovan Bratislava

 Czechoslovak First League (1): 1954-55
 Czechoslovak Cup (2): 1961–62, 1962–63

Manager

 ŠK Slovan Bratislava

 Czechoslovak First League (2): 1973-74, 1974-75
 Czechoslovak Cup (1): 1973–74

 Czechoslovakia

 UEFA Euro 1980: third place
 1990 FIFA World Cup: quarter-final

 Kuala Lumpur City

 Malaysian First Division (1): 1986
 Malaysia Cup: 1987

Death

On 26 January 2021, Vengloš died at the age of 84.

Cultural references

Vengloš is mentioned in the song "This One's For Now", by the band Half Man Half Biscuit on their 2014 album, Urge For Offal.

References

External links

 
 

1936 births
2021 deaths
Sportspeople from Ružomberok
Association football midfielders
Slovak footballers
Czechoslovak footballers
ŠK Slovan Bratislava players
Slovak football managers
Slovak expatriate football managers
Czechoslovak football managers
Czechoslovak expatriate football managers
Czechoslovakia national football team managers
Slovakia national football team managers
Australia national soccer team managers
Oman national football team managers
FC VSS Košice managers
Aston Villa F.C. managers
Fenerbahçe football managers
Celtic F.C. managers
Kuala Lumpur City F.C. managers
Expatriate football managers in England
Expatriate football managers in Japan
Expatriate football managers in Portugal
Expatriate football managers in Scotland
Expatriate football managers in Turkey
J1 League managers
JEF United Chiba managers
UEFA Euro 1980 managers
1982 FIFA World Cup managers
1990 FIFA World Cup managers
Expatriate football managers in Malaysia
Slovak expatriate sportspeople in Scotland
Scottish Premier League managers
Expatriate soccer managers in Australia
Expatriate football managers in Oman
Czechoslovak expatriate sportspeople in Australia
Czechoslovak expatriate sportspeople in Portugal
Czechoslovak expatriate sportspeople in Malaysia
Czechoslovak expatriate sportspeople in England
Czechoslovak expatriate sportspeople in Turkey
Slovak expatriate sportspeople in Oman
Slovak expatriate sportspeople in Japan
Sydney FC Prague managers